Krishna is a Hindu deity. 

Krishna may refer to:

Hinduism
The name comes from a Sanskrit word (कृष्ण, kṛṣṇa) that means 'black' or 'dark blue'. Certain other figures within Hinduism also have names transliterated as Krishna. These include (with added phonetic spellings);
 Vyasa -  (the dark one born on an island)
 Draupadi - , कृष्णा, Krishnaa (the dark one the princess of Panchala, feminine form)
 Arjuna -  he is called Kṛṣṇa in one instance toward the end of his life
 Durga - she is called  in the Virataparva (feminine form)

Related
 Krishna Janmashtami Hindu festival.
 Krishna Yajurveda (Black Yajurveda), one of the two samhitas (collections) of Yajurveda, Hindu religious text
 Kṛṣṇa, the Supreme Personality of Godhead, also known as  book
 The Krishnas, International Society for Krishna Consciousness (popularly called the "Hare Krishnas"), a Gaudiya Vaishnava religious movement
 Hare Krishna (mantra), a 16-word Vaishnava mantra brought to international attention by the Society

Geography
 Krishna River that flows through Maharashtra, Karnataka and Andhra Pradesh (this should correctly be Kṛṣṇā, in feminine form)
 Krishna district, district of Andhra Pradesh, named after Krishna River
 Krishna Wildlife Sanctuary, a wildlife refuge in Andhra Pradesh
 Godavari-Krishna mangroves, a mangrove ecosystem formed by the delta of river Krishna

Transportation
 Krishna Express, a train of the South Central Railway running between Tirupati and Adilabad

Newspapers
 Krishna Patrika, a Telugu language newspaper founded in the year 1909

Film and TV
 Krishna (1996 Hindi film) , a 1996 Hindi film starring Sunil Shetty and Karisma Kapoor
 Krishna (1996 Tamil film), a 1996 Tamil language film directed by Raja Krishnamoorthy
 Krishna (2006 film), a 2006 computer-animated feature, the first one in Hindi
 Krishna (2007 film), a 2007 Kannada film starring Ganesh and Pooja Gandhi
 Krishna (2008 film), a 2008 Telugu film starring Ravi Teja and Trisha Krishnan
 Krishna, the Malayalam-dubbed version of the 2008 Telugu film Parugu

People
 Krishna (Satavahana dynasty), c. 1st century BCE king of Deccan region in India
 Krishna I (756–774), the King of Rashtrakuta dynasty of India after Dantidurga
 Krishna II (878–914), the King of Rashtrakuta dynasty of India after Amoghavarsha I
 Krishna III (939–967), the King of Rashtrakuta dynasty of India after Amoghavarsha III
 Krishna of Devagiri, a 13th-century Yadava king of India
 Lal Krishna Advani, Indian politician
 S. M. Krishna, politician from Karnataka
 Krishna (politician), politician from Karnataka
 Krishna (Kannada actor), Kannada film actor
 Krishna (Malayalam actor), Malayalam film actor
 Krishna (Tamil actor), Tamil film actor
 Krishna (Telugu actor) , Indian Telugu film actor
 Krishna (TV actor) (born 1982), Indian film and television actor
 Krishna (director), Krishnan K.T. Nagarajan, Indian director of Tamil films
 Krishna Beura, Indian playback singer
 Krishna Bhagavaan , Indian Telugu film actor
 Krishna Bhanji, the birth name of actor Sir Ben Kingsley
 Krishna Chandra Bhattacharya, Hindu philosopher at Calcutta University
 Krishna Deva Raya (1509–1529), famed emperor of the Vijayanagara Empire
 Krishna Foster (born 1970), American environmental chemist 
 Krishna Kumar (actor), Tamil and Malayalam film actor
 Krishna Kumari (actress) (1933–2018),  Indian Telugu film actress
 Krishna Menon (1897–1974), Indian Defence Minister during the Sino-Indian War
 Krishna Rao (disambiguation), one of the Indian names
 Krishna Savjani (born 1947), Malawian lawyer
 Krishna Sekhar, Tamil film actor
 Krishna Vamsi , Indian Telugu film director
 Krishna Rani (born 2001), Bangladeshi footballer
 Roy Krishna, Fijian professional footballer
 Tottempudi Krishna , Indian Telugu film director
 Krishna Kaul, known as KR$NA, is an Indian rapper.
 Jiddu Krishnamurti (1895–1986), Indian philosopher

Education
 Krishna University, a university in Machilipatnam, Krishna district, Andhra Pradesh, India

Other
 USS Krishna (ARL-38)

See also
 Krishnaiah (disambiguation)
 Krishnayya (disambiguation)